Bang Bon is one of the 50 districts (khet) of Bangkok, Thailand. Its neighbours, clockwise from north, are Bang Khae, Phasi Charoen, Chom Thong, and Bang Khun Thian districts of Bangkok, Mueang Samut Sakhon district and Krathum Baen district of Samut Sakhon province, and Nong Khaem district of Bangkok.

History
Formerly Bang Bon was a tambon of amphoe Bang Khun Thian in Thonburi Province, prior to the merger of Thonburi and Phra Nakhon into a single province, after which it was a sub-district of Bang Khun Thian District.

On 14 October 1997, Bang Bon was split from Bang Khun Thian and established as a new district. The district office opened on 6 March 1998, the last of Bangkok's 50 districts to open, first established temporarily at the Thepyada Arak Fresh Market building, but later moved to a permanent location on Ekkachai Road.

Administration
The district has four sub-districts (khwaeng).

Economy
Agriculture is an important part of the area economy. Among Bang Bon's famous products are Nam Doc Mai mangos, coconuts, orchids, and lotus.

Places
Wat Bang Bon
7th Cycle Birthday Anniversary Park, Bang Bon, otherwise known as 9 Hills Park
Sarasas Witaed Bangbon School
Suksanareewittaya School, formerly and still colloquially known as Suksanari 2 School (shared with Samut Sakhon province)

Notable people
Chalerm Yubamrung – politician

References

External links
 District website (Thai)
 BMA website with the tourist landmarks of Bang Bon

 
Districts of Bangkok